Ağabəyli or Ağabeyli or Agabeyli or Agabayli or Agebeyli may refer to:
Ağabəyli, Aghjabadi, Azerbaijan
Ağabəyli, Agsu, Azerbaijan